This list identifies the military aircraft which are currently being operated or have formerly been operated by the Indonesian National Armed Forces.

Current aircraft

Indonesian Air Force

Indonesian Army Aviation

Indonesian Naval Aviation

Notes

References

Indonesian National Armed Forces
Indonesian military-related lists
Indonesian military aircraft
Indonesian Air Force